Aristides Maria Pereira (17 November 1923 – 22 September 2011) was a Cape Verdean politician. He was the first President of Cape Verde, serving from 1975 to 1991.

Biography
Pereira was born in Fundo das Figueiras, on the island of Boa Vista. His first job was chief of telecommunications in Guinea-Bissau. From the late 1940s until Cape Verde's independence, Pereira was heavily involved in the anti-colonial movement, organizing strikes and rising through the hierarchy of his party, the African Party for the Independence of Guinea and Cape Verde (Partido Africano da Independência da Guiné e Cabo Verde, known as PAIGC). In clandestine activity he often used the pseudonym Alfredo Bangura.

Although Pereira initially promised to lead a democratic and socialist nation upon becoming president, he compounded the country's chronic poverty by crushing dissent following the overthrow of Luís Cabral, who was President of Guinea-Bissau and Pereira's ally in the drive to unite the two Lusophone states. However, Cape Verde had a much better human rights record than most countries in Africa and was known as one of the most democratic (despite the restriction on party activity) because of the power delegated to local citizens' committees and his own government was able to cope with the drought that hit the country. Cape Verde is one of the few African countries that never had the death penalty, in fact it was banned in 1983. While Guinea-Bissau remained close to the Soviet Union, Cape Verde  maintained a policy of non-alignment.

On November 14, 1980, a coup, led by João Bernardo Vieira, overthrew Cabral and replaced the one-party regime with a Military Junta. In response to this, Pereira and his Prime Minister, Pedro Pires, cut diplomatic relations with Guinea-Bissau, dissolved the PAIGC and replaced it with the African Party for the Independence of Cape Verde, removing the name of Guinea. Guinea-Bissau and Cape Verde restored bilateral relations in 1982, when Mozambican President Samora Machel managed to bring together the two leaders (Vieira and Pereira) in Maputo, and a Cape Verdean ambassador was sent to Guinea-Bissau in 1983.

Another major difference between the two countries was the difference between the political tranquility of Cape Verde, which would later become multiparty in an extremely peaceful way, and the constant authoritarianism and strong instability in Guinea-Bissau.

The country's policies during Pereira's rule tended toward Cold War nonalignment and economic reforms to help the peasantry. Pedro Pires served as prime minister for the duration of Pereira's presidency.

After PAICV decided to introduce multiparty democracy in February 1990, Pereira stepped down as General Secretary of PAICV in July 1990 and was succeeded in that post by Pires. Pereira was the PAICV candidate in the February 1991 presidential election, but António Mascarenhas Monteiro defeated him by a large margin.

While hospitalized in Portugal, Pereira died on September 22, 2011. Rabil Airport on the Cape Verdean island of Boa Vista was officially renamed as Aristides Pereira International Airport in  tribute to him on November 19, 2011. His widow, Carlina Pereira, the former First Lady and a leading figure in the country's independence movement, died on December 11, 2011, at the age of 87.

References

External links
The Independent: Aristides Pereira obituary

1923 births
2011 deaths
Presidents of Cape Verde
African Party for the Independence of Cape Verde politicians
People from Boa Vista, Cape Verde